Hullambi is a village in Dharwad district of Karnataka, India.

Demographics 
As of the 2011 Census of India there were 315 households in Hullambi and a total population of 1,477 consisting of 747 males and 730 females. There were 183 children ages 0-6.

Notable people
C. P. Siddhashrama - Academic, critic and writer in Kannada, was born in the village.

References

Villages in Dharwad district